The following is a list of Luxembourgish composers.

A
 Pol Albrecht (1874–1975)

B
 Louis Beicht (1886–1943)
 Tom Bimmermann (b. 1971)
 Emile Boeres (1890–1944)
 Ivan Boumans (1983)
 Alexis Brasseur (1860–1924)
 Helen Buchholtz (1877–1953)

C
 Pierre Cao (b. 1937)
 Walter Civitareale (b. 1954)

D
 Paul Dahm (b. 1951)
 Philippe Decker (1840–1881)

E
 Pierre Even (b. 1946)

F
 Johny Fritz (b. 1944)

H
 Dominique Heckmes (1878–1938)
 Julien Hoffmann (b. 1924)

K
 Gustave Kahnt (1848–1923)
 Jean-Pierre Kemmer (1923–1991)
 Camille Kerger (b. 1957)
 Jean-Marie Kieffer (b. 1960)
 Lou Koster (1889–1973)

L
 Claude Lenners (b. 1956)
 Georges Lentz (b. 1965)

M
 Laurent Menager (1835–1902)
 Alexander Mullenbach (b. 1949)
 Joseph-Alexandre Müller (1854-1931)

P

 Henri Pensis (1900–1958)
 Albena Petrovic-Vratchanska (b. 1965)

S
 Francesco Tristano Schlimé (b. 1981)

T
 J. B. Tresch (1773–1821)

W
 Gast Waltzing (b. 1956)
 Marcel Wengler (b. 1947)

Z
  Jean Antoine Zinnen (1827–1898)

Luxembourgian